Benjamín Flores (May 24, 1984 – May 5, 2009) was a Mexican professional boxer from Morelia, Michoacán. He died from a brain injury sustained during his defeat on April 30, 2009, by Al Seeger.

References

1984 births
2009 deaths
Deaths due to injuries sustained in boxing
Deaths from head injury
Boxers from Michoacán
Sportspeople from Morelia
Sports deaths in Texas
Mexican male boxers
Super-bantamweight boxers